Washington State may refer to:
 Washington (state), a U.S. state, often referred to as "Washington state" to distinguish it from the American capital city, Washington D.C.
 Washington State University, a land-grant college located in the state of Washington
 Washington State Cougars, the athletic program of Washington State University

See also 
 Washington/State, a closed subway station on the Chicago Transit Authority's Red Line
 State of Washington (sternwheeler), steamboat